Cristina Bucșa and María Fernanda Herazo were the defending champions, but Herazo chose not to participate. Bucșa partnered alongside Diāna Marcinkēviča, but lost in the quarterfinals to Lou Brouleau and Ioana Loredana Roșca.

Ekaterine Gorgodze and Maryna Zanevska won the title, defeating Aliona Bolsova and Tereza Mrdeža in the final, 6–7(8–10), 7–5, [10–8].

Seeds

Draw

Draw

References

External Links
Main Draw

L'Open 35 de Saint-Malo - Doubles
L'Open 35 de Saint-Malo